Tampea metaphaeola is a moth of the subfamily Arctiinae first described by George Hampson in 1900. It is found on Borneo, Sulawesi and Sangir.

References

Lithosiini